Yashica Dutt is an Indian writer and journalist who has written on a broad range of topics including fashion, gender, identity, culture and caste. She was previously working as a Principal Correspondent with Brunch, Hindustan Times in New Delhi. She also worked with The Asian Age.

Early life and education
Yashica was born in a Valmiki (Dalit) family in Ajmer, Rajasthan on 5 February 1986. Her mother's name is Shashi Dutt. She completed her graduation in B.Sc. from St. Stephen's College, Delhi in 2007. Yashica completed her Master's degree in Arts and Culture Journalism from Columbia University Graduate School of Journalism in 2015.

Career
As a freelance journalist, Yashica has worked with Hindustan Times, LiveMint, Scroll.in, The Wire and HuffPost India. During her stint at the Hindustan Times, she initiated the social media activities for Brunch, the Sunday magazine of Hindustan Times. Yashica writes on Dalit related social issues and is the founder of dalitdiscrimination.tumblr.com, a Tumblr blog portal.

Book
Coming Out as Dalit is Yashica's book published by Aleph Book Company. It is her memoir about growing up in a Dalit family. In the book, she describes how she felt compelled to hide her caste and pretended to be of another caste, all along terrified of her true identity being found out. Her decision to end the pretense of being an upper caste woman was triggered by a University of Hyderabad Dalit student Rohith Vemula's last letter, which was made public following his suicide. The book details her journey of coming to terms with her true identity. The book is a social commentary woven with personal experiences. She received the Sahitya Akademi Yuva Puraskar for the book in the English category for the year 2020.

References

External links
Official Website
Columbia University profile
 
 

Indian women journalists
English-language writers from India
1986 births
Living people
Dalit writers
Dalit women writers
Women writers from Rajasthan
Journalists from Rajasthan
People from Ajmer